The Union for Democracy and Social Progress (UDPS) is one of the major contemporary political parties in the Democratic Republic of the Congo (DRC) together with the Movement for the Liberation of the Congo. The party has the lengthiest record of continuous operation in the DRC.

The UDPS has boycotted the 2006 general election results, complaining of fraud. Étienne Tshisekedi, then-leader of the party, ran for president in the 2011 general election. The incumbent party leader is Félix Tshisekedi, son of Étienne, who is the president of the DRC. Various members of the party, including Étienne Tshisekedi, have also served as prime minister.

Election history

Presidential

Senate

National Assembly

References

External links

1982 establishments in Zaire
Observer parties of the Socialist International
Political parties established in 1982
Political parties in the Democratic Republic of the Congo
Progressive Alliance
Social democratic parties in Africa
Socialism in the Democratic Republic of the Congo